Oceanhouse Media, Inc. is a publisher of iOS, Android and Windows 8 apps.  Their offerings include digital book apps from brands such as Dr. Seuss, The Berenstain Bears and Little Critter, as well as self-improvement apps from Hay House authors, and Chicken Soup for the Soul.
Oceanhouse Media was founded in January 2009 by Michel and Karen Kripalani in Encinitas, California. The company released its first iOS app, Bowls - Authentic Tibetan Singing Bowls, on the Apple App Store in March 2009.
Oceanhouse Media currently has licensing agreements in place with Dr. Seuss Enterprises, Hay House, Mercer Mayer, HarperCollins, Random House, Houghton Mifflin Harcourt Publishing Company, Chronicle Books, Chicken Soup for the Soul and many others.

Products 

Oceanhouse Media has published more than 350 apps for iOS devices, ranging from $0.99 to US$15.00, as well as several free apps.  The company also has more than 160 Android apps available on Google Play and the Amazon App Store.

omBook® 

Oceanhouse Media possesses the registered trademark omBook® for its Oceanhouse Media digital book apps for children.

Brands 

Oceanhouse Media has released apps from the following brands:

Dr. Seuss
The Cat in the Hat's Learning Library
The Berenstain Bears
Little Critter, by Mercer Mayer
Smithsonian Institution
Ziggy Marley
Once Upon a Potty
Rudolph the Red-Nosed Reindeer
Chicken Soup for the Soul
Hay House authors such as Louise L. Hay, Dr. Wayne W. Dyer, Doreen Virtue, Deepak Chopra, and others.

Parents’ choice awards 

Oceanhouse Media apps have been recognized by several Parents’ Choice Awards.

Parents’ Choice Award: Gold 

Ice Is Nice! (Dr. Seuss/Cat in the Hat), Fall 2013
On Beyond Bugs (Dr. Seuss/Cat in the Hat), Fall 2013

Parents' Choice Award: Silver 

The Cat In The Hat - Dr. Seuss, Spring 2010
Dr. Seuss's ABC, Spring 2011
Green Eggs and Ham - Dr. Seuss, Spring 2011
Oh, the Thinks You Can Think! - Dr. Seuss, Fall 2011
Oh Say Can You Say Di-no-saur? (Dr. Seuss/Cat in the Hat), Fall 2012
Trains - Byron Barton, Spring 2013
A Whale of a Tale! (Dr. Seuss/Cat in the Hat), Spring 2013

References 

Mass media companies of the United States
Software companies of the United States